Taipei Fubon Bank  is a bank based in Taiwan. It was founded on 1 January 2005 from a merger of Fubon Bank with TaipeiBank.

 	
It is 100% held by Fubon Financial Holding Co., Ltd.

See also

List of banks in Taiwan
Economy of Taiwan
List of companies of Taiwan

References

External links 
 Fubon Financial Holding
 Official homepage - Taipei Fubon Bank 

Banks of Taiwan
2005 establishments in Taiwan
Taiwanese brands